The Laurence Olivier Award for Best Company Performance was a one-off award presented by the Society of London Theatre in recognition of achievements in commercial London theatre. The awards were established as the Society of West End Theatre Awards in 1976, and renamed in 1984 in honour of English actor and director Laurence Olivier.

This award was only presented once, at the 2009 Laurence Olivier Awards.

Winners and nominees

2000s

References

External links
 

Company Performance